Bill Kennedy may refer to:

Sports

Baseball
 Bill Kennedy (1942–47 pitcher) (1918–1995), American baseball player
 Bill Kennedy (1948–57 pitcher) (1921–1983), American baseball player
 Brickyard Kennedy (1867–1915), also known as Bill, American baseball player

Football
 Bill Kennedy (footballer, born 1875) (1875–1939), Australian rules footballer for Collingwood
 Bill Kennedy (footballer, born 1882) (1882–1970), Australian rules footballer for St Kilda
 Bill Kennedy (Scottish footballer) (1912–1989), footballer with Southampton F.C.
 Bill Kennedy (American football) (1919–1998), American football player
 Bill Kennedy (New Zealand footballer), international footballer, c. 1967

Other sports
 Bill Kennedy (basketball) (1938–2006), American basketball player
 Bill Kennedy (referee) (born 1966), American basketball referee
 Bill Kennedy (swimmer) (born 1952), Canadian swimmer
 Bill Kennedy (runner), on List of winners of the Boston Marathon for 1917

Other uses
Bill Kennedy (actor) (1908–1997), American actor, voice artist and TV show host
Bill Kennedy (politician) (1919–2001), Australian politician

See also
Billy Kennedy (disambiguation)
William Kennedy (disambiguation)